James Bryce, 1st Viscount Bryce,  (10 May 1838 – 22 January 1922), was a British academic, jurist, historian, and Liberal politician. According to Keoth Robbins, he was a widely-traveled authority on law, government, and history whose expertise led to high political offices culminating with his successful role as ambassador to the United States, 1907–13.  His intellectual influence was greatest in The American Commonwealth (1888), an in-depth study of American politics that shaped the understanding of America in Britain and in the United States as well.

Background and education
Bryce was born in Arthur Street in Belfast, County Antrim, in Ulster, the son of Margaret, daughter of James Young of Whiteabbey, and James Bryce, LLD, from near Coleraine, County Londonderry. The first eight years of his life were spent residing at his grandfather's Whiteabbey residence, often playing for hours on the tranquil picturesque shoreline. Annan Bryce was his younger brother. He was educated under his uncle Reuben John Bryce at the Belfast Academy, Glasgow High School, the University of Glasgow, the University of Heidelberg and Trinity College, Oxford.

He was elected a fellow of Oriel College, Oxford, in 1862 and was called to the Bar, Lincoln's Inn, in 1867. His days as a student at the University of Heidelberg gave him a long-life admiration of German historical and legal scholarship. He became a believer in "Teutonic freedom", an ill-defined concept that was held to bind Germany, Britain and the United States together. For him, the United States, the British Empire and Germany were "natural friends".

Academic career
Bryce was admitted to the Bar and practised law in London for a few years but was soon called back to Oxford to become Regius Professor of Civil Law, a position he held from 1870 to 1893. From 1870 to 1875 he was also Professor of Jurisprudence at Owens College, Manchester. His reputation as a historian had been made as early as 1864 by his work on the Holy Roman Empire.

In 1872 Bryce travelled to Iceland to see the land of the Icelandic sagas, as he was a great admirer of Njáls saga. He agreed that the evidence fit the Armenian Church's belief that it was from Noah's Ark and offered no other explanations.

In 1872 Bryce, a proponent of higher education, particularly for women, joined the Central Committee of the National Union for Improving the Education of Women of All Classes (NUIEWC).

Member of Parliament

In 1880 Bryce, an ardent Liberal in politics, was elected to the House of Commons as member for the constituency of Tower Hamlets in London. In 1885 he was returned for South Aberdeen and he was re-elected there on succeeding occasions. He remained a Member of Parliament until 1907.

Bryce's intellectual distinction and political industry made him a valuable member of the Liberal Party. As early as the late 1860s he served as Chairman of the Royal Commission on Secondary Education. In 1885 he was made Under-Secretary of State for Foreign Affairs under William Ewart Gladstone but had to leave office after the Liberals were defeated in the general election later that year. In 1892 he joined Gladstone's last cabinet as Chancellor of the Duchy of Lancaster and was sworn of the Privy Council at the same time.

In 1894 Bryce was appointed President of the Board of Trade in the new cabinet of Lord Rosebery, but had to leave this office, along with the whole Liberal cabinet, the following year. The Liberals remained out of office for the next ten years.

In 1897, after a visit to South Africa, Bryce published a volume of Impressions of that country that had considerable influence in Liberal circles when the Second Boer War was being discussed. He devoted significant sections of the book to the recent history of South Africa, various social and economic details about the country, and his experiences while travelling with his party.

The "still radical" Bryce was made Chief Secretary for Ireland in Prime Minister Sir Henry Campbell-Bannerman's cabinet in 1905 and remained in office throughout 1906. Bryce was critical of many of the social reforms proposed by this Liberal Government, including old-age pensions, the Trade Disputes Act and the redistributive "People's Budget," which he regarded as making unwarranted concessions to socialism.

The American Commonwealth (1888) 
Bryce had become well known in America for his book The American Commonwealth (1888), a thorough examination of the institutions of the United States from the point of view of a historian and constitutional lawyer. Bryce painstakingly reproduced the travels of Alexis de Tocqueville, who wrote Democracy in America (1835–1840). Tocqueville had emphasised the egalitarianism of early-19th-century America, but Bryce was dismayed to find vast inequality: "Sixty years ago, there were no great fortunes in America, few large fortunes, no poverty. Now there is some poverty ... and a greater number of gigantic fortunes than in any other country of the world" and "As respects education ... the profusion of…elementary schools tends to raise the mass to a higher point than in Europe ... [but] there is an increasing class that has studied at the best universities. It appears that equality has diminished [in this regard] and will diminish further." The work was heavily used in academia, partly as a result of Bryce's close friendships with men such as James B. Angell, President of the University of Michigan and successively Charles W. Eliot and Abbott Lawrence Lowell at Harvard. The work also became a key text for American writers seeking to popularise a view of American history as distinctively Anglo-Saxon.

Ambassador to the United States

In February 1907 Bryce was appointed Ambassador to the United States. He held this office until 1913, and was very efficient in strengthening Anglo-American ties and friendship. He made many personal friends among American politicians, such as President Theodore Roosevelt.  The German ambassador in Washington, Graf Heinrich von Bernstorff, later stated how relieved he felt that Bryce was not his competitor for American sympathies during the First World War, even though Bernstorff helped to keep the United States from declaring war until 1917.

Peerage
In 1914, after his retirement as Ambassador and his return to Britain, Bryce was raised to the peerage as Viscount Bryce, of Dechmount in the County of Lanark. Thus he became a member of the House of Lords, the powers of which had been curtailed by the Parliament Act 1911.

First World War
Following the outbreak of the First World War Bryce was commissioned by Prime Minister H. H. Asquith to write what became known as The Bryce Report in which he described German atrocities in Belgium. The report was published in 1915 and was damning of German behaviour against civilians. Bryce's account was confirmed by Vernon Lyman Kellogg, the Director of the American Commission for Relief in Belgium, who told the New York Times that the German military had enslaved hundreds of thousands of Belgian workers, and abused and maimed many of them in the process.

Bryce strongly condemned the Armenian genocide in the Ottoman Empire mainly in 1915. Bryce was the first person to speak on the subject in the House of Lords, in July 1915. Later, with the assistance of the historian Arnold J. Toynbee, he produced a documentary record of the massacres that was published as a Blue Book by the British government in 1916. In 1921 Bryce wrote that the Armenian genocide had also claimed half of the population of the Assyrians in the Ottoman Empire and that similar cruelties had been perpetrated upon them.

Beliefs 
According to Moton Keller: Bryce believed in Liberalism, the classic 19th century Liberalism of John Bright and William Gladstone, of free trade, free speech and press, personal liberty, and responsible leadership. This notably genial gregarious man had his hates, chief among them illiberal regimes: the Turkish oppressors of Bulgars and Armenians, and, later the Kaiser's Reich in World War I. 

Bryce had a distrust of current democratic practices seen as late as his Modern Democracy (1921). On the other hand he was a leader in promoting international organizations. During the last years of his life Bryce served as a judge at the International Court in The Hague, and promoted the establishment of the League of Nations.

Honours and other public appointments

Bryce received numerous academic honours from home and foreign universities. In September 1901, he received the degree of Doctor of Laws from Dartmouth College, and in October 1902 he received an honorary degree (LLD) from the University of St Andrews.
He became a fellow of the Royal Society in 1894.

In earlier life, he was a notable mountain climber, ascending Mount Ararat in 1876, and published a volume on Transcaucasia and Ararat in 1877; in 1899 to 1901, he was the president of the Alpine Club. From his Caucasian journey, he brought back a deep distrust of Ottoman rule in Asia Minor and a distinct sympathy for the Armenian people.

In 1882, Bryce established the National Liberal Club, whose members, in its first three decades, included fellow founder Prime Minister Gladstone, George Bernard Shaw, David Lloyd George, H. H. Asquith and many other prominent Liberal candidates and MP's such as Winston Churchill and Bertrand Russell. In April 1882 Bryce was elected a member of the American Antiquarian Society.

In 1907 he was made a Member of the Order of Merit by King Edward VII. At the King's death, Bryce arranged his Washington Memorial Service. At the time of Bryce's memorial service at Westminster Abbey, his wife, Elizabeth, received condolences from King George V, who "regarded Lord Bryce as an old friend and trusted counsellor to whom I could always turn." Queen Victoria had said that Bryce was "one of the best informed men on all subjects I have ever met".

Bryce was president of the American Political Science Association from 1907 to 1908. He was the fourth person to hold this office. He was president of the British Academy from 1913 to 1917. In 1919 he delivered the British Academy's inaugural Raleigh Lecture on History, on "World History". 

Bryce chaired the Conference on the Reform of the Second Chamber in 1917–1918.

Personal life

Bryce married Elizabeth Marion, daughter of Thomas Ashton and sister of Thomas Ashton, 1st Baron Ashton of Hyde, in 1889. Lord and Lady Bryce  had no children. 

Bryce died on 22 January 1922, aged 83, in Sidmouth, Devon, on the last of his lifelong travels. The viscountcy died with him. He was cremated at Golders Green Crematorium.

Lady Bryce  is recalled in the memoirs of  Captain Peter Middleton, grandfather of Catherine, Duchess of Cambridge who wrote, "Nor will I forget my terror of Lady Bryce", who was the aunt of his mother's first cousins, sisters  Elinor  and Elizabeth Lupton. 

Lady Bryce died in 1939. Her  papers are held at the  Bodleian Library.

Memorials

There is a large monument to Viscount Bryce in the southwest section of the Grange Cemetery in Edinburgh, facing north at the west end of the central east–west avenue. It is presumed that his ashes are buried there.

There is a bust of Viscount Bryce in Trinity Church on Broadway, near Wall Street in New York. A similar bust is in the U.S. Capitol Building and there is a commemorative Bryce Park in Washington DC.

In 1965 the James Bryce Chair of Government was endowed at the University of Glasgow. "Government" was changed to "Politics" in 1970.

In 2013 the Ulster History Circle unveiled a blue plaque dedicated to him, near his birthplace in Belfast.

On the occasion of the 160th anniversary of Bryce's birth, a small street off of Baghramyan Avenue in Yerevan, Armenia was named "James Bryce Street" in 1998.

Publications

The Flora of the Island of Aran, 1859
 The Holy Roman Empire, First edition 1864 revised edition 1904, many reprints.
Report on the Condition of Education in Lancashire, 1867
The Trade Marks Registration Act, with Introduction and Notes on Trade Mark Law, 1877
Transcaucasia and Ararat, 1877
The American Commonwealth, 1888, Volume I, Volume II, Volume III
Impressions of South Africa, 1897
Studies in History and Jurisprudence, 1901, Volume I, Volume II
 Studies in Contemporary Biography, 1903 
 The Hindrances to Good Citizenship, 1909 Reissued by Transaction Publishers, 1993, edited and with a new Introduction by Howard G. Schneiderman
 South America: Observations and Impressions 1912

The Treatment of Armenians in the Ottoman Empire 1915–16, 1916
 Essays and Addresses in War Time, 1918
Modern Democracies, 1921 Volume I, Volume II

His Studies in History and Jurisprudence (1901) and Studies in Contemporary Biography (1903) were republications of essays.

Selected articles
 "The Future of English Universities," The Fortnightly Review, Vol. XXXIX, 1883.
 "An Ideal University," The Contemporary Review, Vol. XLV, June 1884.
 "The Relations of History and Geography," The Contemporary Review, Vol. XLIX, January/June 1886.
 "An Age of Discontent," The Contemporary Review, Vol. LIX, January 1891.
 "The Migrations of the Races of Men Considered Historically," The Contemporary Review, Vol. LXII, July 1892.
 "The Teaching of Civic Duty," Educational Review, Vol. VI, 1893.
 "Equality," The Century; A Popular Quarterly, Vol. LVI, No. 3, July 1898.
 "What is Progress?," The Atlantic Monthly, Vol. C, 1907.

Famous quotations
"Patriotism consists not in waving the flag, but in striving that our country shall be righteous as well as strong."
"No government demands so much from the citizen as Democracy and none gives back so much."
"Life is too short for reading inferior books."
"Excessive anger against human stupidity is itself one of the most provoking forms of stupidity."

References

Further reading
 “Lord Bryce’s Report on Turkish Atrocities in Armenia.” Current History 5#2 (1916), pp. 321–34, online

 Auchincloss, Louis. "Lord Bryce" American Heritage (Apr/May1981) 32#3 pp 98–104.
 Barker, Ernest. "Lord Bryce" English Historical Review 37#146, (1922), pp. 219–24, online.
 Becker, Carl. "Lord Bryce on modern democracies." Political Science Quarterly 36.4 (1921): 663–675 online.
 Bradshaw, Katherine A. "The Misunderstood Public Opinion of James Bryce." Journalism History 28.1 (2002): 16-25.
 Brock, William Ranulf. "James Bryce and the Future."  Proceedings of the British Academy (2002), Vol. 88, p3-27.
 DeFleur, Margaret H. "James Bryce's 19th-Century Theory of Public Opinion in the Contemporary Age of New Communications Technologies." Mass Communication and Society 1.1-2 (1998): 63-84.

 Fisher, H.A.L. James Bryce (2 vol 1927); scholarly biography; vol 1 online
 Hammack, David C. "Elite Perceptions of Power in the Cities of the United States, 1880-1900: The Evidence of James Bryce, Moisei Ostrogorski, and Their American Informants." Journal of Urban History 4.4 (1978): 363-396.

 Hanson, Russell L.  “Tyranny of the majority or fatalism of the multitude? Bryce on Democracy in America,” in America Through European Eyes. British and French Reflections on the New World from the Eighteenth Century to the Present, ed by  Aurelian Craiutu and Jeffrey C. Isaac (Penn State UP, 2009) pp. 213–36.
 Harvie, Christopher. “Ideology and Home Rule: James Bryce, A. V. Dicey and Ireland, 1880-1887.” English Historical Review 91#359, (1976), pp. 298–314, online.

 Ions, Edmund. James Bryce and American Democracy, 1870–1922 (Macmillan, 1968). online

 Keller,  Morton. “James Bryce and America,” The Wilson Quarterly 124 (1988), pp. 86–95. online
 Lambert, Robert A., and Magnus Magnusson. “James Bryce: His Access Campaign in Scotland, His Legacy and His Critics.” in Contested Mountains: Nature, Development and Environment in the Cairngorms Region of Scotland, 1880–1980 (White Horse Press, 2001), pp. 60–73, online.
 Lefcowitz, Allan B., et al. “James Bryce’s First Visit to America: The New England Sections of His 1870 Journal and Related Correspondence.” New England Quarterly 50#2, (1977), pp. 314–31, online.
 Lessoff, Alan. "Progress before modernization: Foreign interpretations of American development in James Bryce's generation." American Nineteenth Century History 1.2 (2000): 69-96.

 McCulloch, Gary. "Sensing the realities of English middle-class education: James Bryce and the Schools Inquiry Commission, 1865–1868." History of Education 40.5 (2011): 599-613.
 Maddox, Graham. "James Bryce: Englishness and Federalism in America and Australia." Publius: The Journal of Federalism 34.1 (2004): 53-69. online
 Monger, David. "Networking against Genocide during the First World War: the international network behind the British Parliamentary report on the Armenian Genocide." Journal of Transatlantic Studies (2018) 16#3, p295-316.

 Pollard, A. F. "Lord Bryce and Modern Democracies." History 7.28 (1923): 256–265 online.
 Pombeni, Paolo. "Starting in reason, ending in passion. Bryce, Lowell, Ostrogorski and the problem of democracy." Historical Journal 37.2 (1994): 319-341.
 Posner, Russell M. “The Lord and the Drayman: James Bryce vs. Denis Kearney.” California Historical Quarterly 50#3 (1971), pp. 277–84, online.
 Prochaska, Frank. Eminent Victorians on American Democracy: The View from Albion (Oxford University Press, 2012).
 Robbins Keith. "History and politics: the career of James Bryce." Journal of Contemporary History 7.3 (1972): 37–52.
 Robbins, Keith G. "Lord Bryce and the First World War." Historical Journal 10.2 (1967): 255–278. online
 

 Steinberg, Oded Y. “Teutonism and Romanism: James Bryce’s Holy Roman Empire.” in Race, Nation, History: Anglo-German Thought in the Victorian Era (U of Pennsylvania Press, 2019), pp. 134–56, online.
 Tulloch, Hugh. James Bryce's 'American Commonwealth: The Anglo-American Background (1988). 
 Wilson, Francis G. “James Bryce on Public Opinion: Fifty Years Later.” Public Opinion Quarterly 3#3 (1939), pp. 420–35, online.
 Wilson, Trevor. “Lord Bryce’s Investigation into Alleged German Atrocities in Belgium, 1914-15.” Journal of Contemporary History 14#3, (1979), pp. 369–83, online.
 Wright, John SF. "Anglicizing the United States Constitution: James Bryce's Contribution to Australian Federalism." Publius: The Journal of Federalism 31.4 (2001): 107-130. online.

External links

 
 
 
 
 
 James Bryce, Two Historical Studies: The Ancient Roman Empire and the British Empire in India; Diffusion of Roman and English Law Throughout the World (1914)
 Text of the Bryce report on German atrocities 
 Viscount James Bryce at The Online Library of Liberty
 James Bryce, preface to Shall This Nation Die?, by Joseph Naayem, New York: 1921, quoted in Native Christians Massacred, The Ottoman Genocide of the Assyrians during World War I, 1.3 Genocide Studies and Prevention 326 (2006)
 Atrocities Cured Pacifist, The New York Times, 20 April 1918, at 11
 The American Commonwealth, with an Introduction by Gary L. McDowell (Indianapolis: Liberty Fund, 1995). 2 Vols. See original text in The Online Library of Liberty.

Chancellors of the Duchy of Lancaster
Deputy Lieutenants of Aberdeen
Liberal Party (UK) MPs for English constituencies
Members of the Parliament of the United Kingdom for Aberdeen constituencies
Scottish Liberal Party MPs
Members of the Privy Council of Ireland
Members of the Privy Council of the United Kingdom
Fellows of Oriel College, Oxford
Alumni of Trinity College, Oxford
Members of the Order of Merit
Fellows of the Royal Society
Viscounts in the Peerage of the United Kingdom
Knights Grand Cross of the Royal Victorian Order
Presidents of the Alpine Club (UK)
Bryce, James Bryce, 1st Viscount
Bryce, James Bryce, 1st Viscount
Bryce, James Bryce, 1st Viscount
Politicians from Belfast
UK MPs 1880–1885
UK MPs 1885–1886
UK MPs 1886–1892
UK MPs 1892–1895
UK MPs 1895–1900
UK MPs 1900–1906
UK MPs 1906–1910
UK MPs who were granted peerages
People educated at the Belfast Royal Academy
Ambassadors of the United Kingdom to the United States
Presidents of the British Academy
Regius Professors of Civil Law (University of Oxford)
Chief Secretaries for Ireland
Fellows of the British Academy
Members of the American Antiquarian Society
Recipients of the Pour le Mérite (civil class)
Presidents of the Board of Trade
Presidents of the Oxford Union
Politicians awarded knighthoods
Mount Ararat
Viscounts created by George V
Presidents of the Classical Association